John H. Millman OLY (born 14 June 1989) is an Australian professional tennis player and commentator. He reached a career-high singles ranking of world No. 33 in October 2018. He has won one ATP title in his career.

Personal life 

Millman was born in Brisbane, Australia, into a family of five children (four girls) and he is the second youngest. During his schooling years he attended Brisbane Grammar School then the Anglican Church Grammar School . Outside tennis he enjoys soccer and supports Liverpool Football Club who compete in the English Premier League. In January 2019, Millman received the OLY post-nominal title at the Brisbane International tournament.

Junior career 

Millman made his ITF junior tournament debut in Darwin as a 15-year-old in 2004 and reached the quarterfinals. He made his junior Grand Slam debut at the 2006 Australian Open. He won his first junior tournament in June 2006 at a tournament held in New Caledonia. He then won his next two tournaments in a row held in Fiji and New Zealand respectively. He competed in his last junior tournament at the 2007 Australian Open.

Junior singles finals (3)

Professional career

2008–12: First Future & Challenger titles, top 200 
In 2008, Millman started to pursue professional tennis. He won the F8 Futures in Australia, was runner-up at an F1 in Romania losing to Răzvan Sabău and made the semis of a Morocco F5 tournament. In 2009, Millman's success on the junior circuit continued, making the final of an F2 in Bulgaria and claiming three semi-final appearances: two in Italy and one in Bulgaria. In the same year, Millman injured his back while training with the Australian junior Davis Cup team. Millman improved his career ranking from close to 1,000 to the 300s in 2009. He achieved this by a semi-final performance in a Challenger tournament in Burnie, Tasmania. He won his second Futures event in Kalgoorlie defeating Matthew Ebden and made the second round of qualifying at the Australian Open.

Millman started 2010 by winning a wildcard entry into his hometown tournament, the Brisbane International. Unfortunately, he was drawn to play defending champion Radek Štěpánek in the first round and lost in straight sets. Millman reached the final round of qualifying at the Australian Open qualifying losing to Ukrainian Illya Marchenko. He won his third Futures title in Berri on grass defeating Greg Jones in the final in February. In September, Millman returned to Australia to claim his fourth Futures title of his career in Darwin. In October, he won his first Challenger title in Sacramento by defeating Robert Kendrick.

Millman was again awarded a wildcard into the 2011 Brisbane International main draw where he lost to fellow Australian Matt Ebden. He then competed in Sydney and Australian Open qualifying but fell in the second round in both tournaments. He then competed in Challengers spread across Asia, Australia and Europe before injuring his shoulder during an Italian futures tournament in April. He continued playing injured until Wimbledon qualifying where he lost in the first round to Fritz Wolmarans. Following the loss at Wimbledon he returned to Australia and did not compete in a tennis tournament again until 2012.

At the beginning of 2012 Millman used his protected ranking to enter the Brisbane International qualifying tournament and managed to win three matches to qualify for the main draw, where he lost in the first round to Santiago Giraldo. He then travelled to Melbourne to compete in Australian Open qualifying but was ousted in the first round by Vasek Pospisil. After a year with mixed results on the Future and Challenger circuits, Millman won his first title in over two years in Bendigo where he defeated Ben Mitchell in the final. He finished 2012 with a ranking of World No. 199.

2013–15: Continued Challenger success, injuries and top 100 
Millman began 2013 at the Brisbane International where he entered qualifying and recorded straight set wins over Luke Saville, Alex Bogomolov and Donald Young to make it into the main draw. He then recorded his first ever ATP win against Tatsuma Ito in the first round. Following that victory, he was awarded a main draw wildcard into the 2013 Australian Open. In the second round of Brisbane he faced World No. 3 Andy Murray and lost in three sets.

Following an impressive performance at the Brisbane International, an Australian writer/sports physiologist coined the term 'Millminions' to describe Millman's extensive and loyal fans base. This has since been adopted by the Australian tennis community.

Millman received a wildcard entry into the Apia International Sydney and defeated Tommy Robredo in the first round. He next took on the third seed, Andreas Seppi for a place in the quarterfinals. Millman impressed taking a set off the world No. 23, but eventually lost in three sets.

Millman then competed at the 2013 Australian Open as a wildcard, which was his debut in the main draw at his home slam. He played World No. 84 Tatsuma Ito in the first round. Millman had recently defeated Ito at the Brisbane International, but Ito got the better of Millman in an epic 5 set match 4–6, 4–6, 6–3, 6–0, 5–7. After the loss, Millman mentioned ambitions to make the top 100 by the end of the year.

Millman then played a $50,000 Challenger event at the 2013 McDonald's Burnie International. He defeated compatriot Benjamin Mitchell in the first round despite losing the first set. Although having a first round scare, he cruised through to the final where he faced Stéphane Robert. Millman won the match for his second Challenger title. Attempting to build on his early success in Challenger events in 2013, Millman took part in the $35,000 Shimadzu All Japan Indoor Tennis Championships in Kyoto, Japan. He defeated Marco Chiudinelli in the final to claim his second Challenger title of the year.

Millman was awarded a wild card into the French Open but on 20 May 2013, he announced his withdrawal due to a shoulder injury. Millman was replaced by countryman and rising star Nick Kyrgios who previously had a wildcard for qualification rounds.

Millman did not play a match since May 2013, but he announced via Twitter on 19 February 2014, that he hoped to be back playing by the end of March. It was later announced that his first competition in eleven months would be the Chengdu China F4, commencing on 7 April, where he made the quarter final. His ranking as of June 2014 had fallen to 1193. In August 2014, Millman won the Korea F10 and F11. These were his first titles in 17 months. In September, Millman made the semi final of the Sacramento Challenger, losing in three sets to world number 54 Sam Querrey. The following week, Millman made the final of the Tiburon Challenger, but again lost to Sam Querrey in two sets. He rose 241 ranking positions in these two weeks; up to 285. In November, Millman won his fourth career Challenger title at the Traralgon 2 against James Ward.

Millman commenced the 2015 season at the 2015 Brisbane International with a wild card into the main draw. He defeated Rhyne Williams in round one and almost caused an upset, leading world no. 2 Roger Federer in round two 6–4, 3–1 before losing 6–4, 4–6, 3–6. At the 2015 Australian Open, Millman received another wildcard and lost in the first round to Leonardo Mayer in straight sets.

In February 2015, Millman was forced to retire in round 1 of the Burnie Challenger with a lower back concern. He returned to complete in the Kyoto Challenger where he reached the final but lost 3–6, 6–3, 3–6 against Michał Przysiężny. Millman lost in round of qualifying at the French Open, then played Vicenza Challenger where he was seeded 6th and lost in the final to Íñigo Cervantes. In June, Millman secured his first Grand Slam main draw entry via qualifying for the first time in his career at Wimbledon. Millman defeated 19th seed Tommy Robredo in round 1, before losing to Marcos Baghdatis in round two, despite having a 2 sets to 0 lead. This result increased Millman's ranking and he reached the top 100 for the first time in July 2015. In August, Millman won his sixth and seventh Challenger titles in Kentucky and Aptos. 

Millman ended 2015 with a ranking of World No. 92.

2016: Third round at Major and double-bagel Olympic record
Millman commenced 2016 making the second round of Chennai, before playing in Sydney after being awarded a wildcard. He lost in round one to Tommy Robredo.

He advanced past the first round of the 2016 Australian Open, for the first time in his career with a victory over Argentinian Diego Schwartzman. In the second round Millman defeated Luxembourg world no. 38 Gilles Müller in five sets to advance to the third round of a Grand Slam for the first time in his career. In the third round, Millman fell to fellow Australian and 16th seed Bernard Tomic.

He then reached the quarterfinals of the 2016 Montpellier Open with wins over Julien Benneteau and Édouard Roger-Vasselin. He lost to eventual finalist Paul-Henri Mathieu. Millman next competed at the 2016 Memphis Open, where he defeated Austin Krajicek in the first round before losing to Benjamin Becker. He next suffered back-to-back losses at the 2016 Delray Beach Open and the 2016 Acapulco Open, losing to Steve Johnson and world no. 8 David Ferrer respectively. He next competed at the 2016 Indian Wells tournament, where he defeated Alexander Sarkissian before again losing to Steve Johnson. He then played at the 2016 Miami Open, where he defeated Pablo Carreño before losing to Pablo Cuevas.

Millman next played at the 2016 French Open. He was pulled against 15th seed John Isner. He lost despite winning the first set and having eight set points in the second set and a few in the third set. In the second set, Millman led 5–4 40–0 and was serving, but was still not able to capitalize.

Millman next competed at the 2016 MercedesCup, where he reached the second round.

Millman next competed at the third Grand Slam of the year at the 2016 Wimbledon Championships. He started off against Albert Montañés. He was down two sets to one but came back to win. He then reached the third round of a major for the second time in his career after beating 26th seed Benoît Paire in four sets. He lost there in straight sets against 2nd seed Andy Murray.

Millman reached the second round at the Citi Open, before retiring during his first round match at the Rogers Cup.

Millman then played at the Olympics for the first time. He defeated Ričardas Berankis without losing a single game in the first round, marking this the first time in Olympic tennis history that any player won a match in such fashion. Millman's second round match was against fourth seed Kei Nishikori. Millman served for the opening set and was up 4–0 in the first set tiebreak and was even up a break in the second set but eventually ended up losing in straight sets.

In August, Millman qualified for and made the second round of Cincinnati Masters then made the semifinals of the 2016 Winston-Salem Open; defeating Albert Ramos-Viñolas and Richard Gasquet along the way.
At the US Open, Millman lost to 8th seed Dominic Thiem in round one, despite leading 2 sets to 1. In October, Millman reached the semifinal of the 2016 Ningbo Challenger but was forced to retire with a hip injury.

Millman ended 2016 with a ranking of World No. 84.

2017: Injuries and Davis Cup semifinal
Millman was given a wildcard into the 2017 Brisbane International but withdrew prior to the tournament with a hip injury, which sidelined him for the first five months of the season.

Millman made his return at the Mestre Challenger in May, losing in the first round. At the French Open, just one week after re-joining the tour, Millman lost to 17th seed Roberto Bautista Agut in four sets. Following his exit at Roland Garros, Millman went on to compete in three Challenger events in the lead up to Wimbledon, but failed to make it past the second round in any tournament. At Wimbledon, Millman drew Rafael Nadal in the first round and was easily beaten in straight sets. After little success since returning from injury, Millman had a breakthrough at the Lexington Challenger in August, making it to the final before being defeated by Michael Mmoh in three sets.

At the US Open, Millman produced his best tennis of the season to upset fellow Aussie Nick Kyrgios and Malek Jaziri to progress to the third round, where he eventually lost to Philipp Kohlschreiber.

In September, Millman made his Davis Cup debut in the world group semi-final against Belgium. Millman lost to world number 12 David Goffin. Millman then reached the quarter finals or better in five consecutive Challengers across Asia, winning Hua Hin. Millman ended 2017 with a singles ranking of World No. 128.

2018: Breakthrough: First ATP final, Major quarterfinal after win over Federer, top 50 and career-high ranking
Millman commenced 2018 with a wildcard into the 2018 Brisbane International. He defeated Peter Polansky in round one and had two match points against world number 3 Grigor Dimitrov before losing in three sets. Millman reached the second round of the 2018 Sydney International and Australian Open. In February, Millman won the Kyoto Challenger, the tenth of his career, propelling him back into the world's top 100 after a 12-month absence.

In April, Millman reached his second ATP World Tour semi-final and his first final at Budapest International after saving three match points against Aljaz Bedene in the semi-final. He lost to Marco Cecchinato in the final. In May, Millman won the Aix-en-Provence Challenger, but lost to Denis Shapovalov in the first round of the French Open. In June, Millman qualified for Queen's Club but lost to Novak Djokovic in round 1. He reached the quarterfinal of Eastbourne losing to Marco Cecchinato again. At Wimbledon, Millman lost to Milos Raonic in the second round. By July, Millman's ranking peaked inside the top 50 for the first time.

In September, Millman pulled off a huge upset by defeating the second seed Roger Federer in the fourth round of the US Open, in four sets. This was Millman's first win over a top-ten player and saw him advance to his first Grand Slam quarterfinal, where he lost to eventual champion Novak Djokovic in straight sets.

Millman reached a career-high of World No. 33 on 15 October 2018 and ended 2018 with a singles rank of World No. 38.

2019: Second ATP final and Davis Cup quarterfinal
Millman commenced the season at the Brisbane International, where he lost in the second round to Grigor Dimitrov. At the Sydney International, he reached the quarterfinals, before losing to Gilles Simon in three tight sets. At the Australian Open, Millman defeated Federico Delbonis, before losing to Roberto Bautista Agut in the second round.

At the French Open, Millman was defeated by 5th seed Alexander Zverev in the opening round on Court Philippe-Chatrier.

Entering the grass court season, Millman had disappointing results in the Stuttgart Open, Halle Open and Eastbourne International enduring first round exits in all three. However, he found form at Wimbledon, progressing to an equal career-best 3rd round with victories over Hugo Dellien and 31st seed Laslo Đere before falling to Sam Querrey in straight sets. At the Rogers Cup, Millman reached the second round as a lucky loser.

At the US Open, Millman lost in the first round to eventual champion Rafael Nadal. In September, Millman won the OEC Kaohsiung Challenger. At the Japan Open, Millman made his way to the finals, where he faced Novak Djokovic, but finished short of winning his first ATP title by losing in straight sets.

Millman ended 2019 with a singles rank of World No. 48.

2020: First ATP title, near-second Federer defeat, top 50 year-end ranking 3 years in a row
Millman began his season at the ASB Classic in Auckland where he defeated Michael Mmoh and Karen Khachanov to make the quarter-finals against eventual runner-up Benoît Paire, who he lost to in three sets. After playing the ATP Cup, he played the Australian Open where he reached the third round against Roger Federer. In a close match that was considered one of the best of the tournament, he lost 6–4, 6–7, 4–6, 6–4, 6–7 which put him close to defeating Federer and causing an upset for a second time.

Millman had disappointing results over the rest of the American hard court season, losing in first and second round matches in Delray Beach, Acapulco, Cincinnati, and the US Open, where he lost to Frances Tiafoe in the second round.

Millman won the singles title at the 2020 Astana Open, defeating Adrian Mannarino 7–5, 6–1 in the final on 1 November 2020 to secure his first ATP Tour title.

Millman ended 2020 with a singles rank of World No. 38.

2021: Olympics in singles and doubles
In July, Millman represented Australia at the 2020 Summer Olympics. He was defeated by Alejandro Davidovich Fokina in the second round. He also participated in the doubles competition with Luke Saville.

At the 2021 Sofia Open he reached his fourth quarterfinal for the season (after Munich, Washington and Astana in Nur-Sultan), and for a second year in a row at the tournament, where he lost to Marcos Giron in 70 minutes. Millman was aiming to reach his first tour-level semifinal since Astana in 2020, where he won his maiden ATP Tour trophy. Millman ended 2021 with a singles rank of World No. 72.

2022–23: Loss of form, out of top 150

Millman received a wildcard into the 2023 Australian Open where he reached the second round.

Fan popularity 

Millman revealed in early 2012 that support he received while injured and contemplating retirement in 2011 gave him the drive to continue pursuing tennis as a career. While competing at his hometown tournament, the 2013 Brisbane International, Millman received an immense amount of support at every match he competed in. It was later revealed his supporters had developed a reputation in the locker room. Millman is well known for thanking his supporters following each match and often hands out drinks from the fridge to his fans at the conclusion of his matches. Following his match against Andy Murray, the hashtag term '#Millman' began trending worldwide on Twitter for several hours.

Millmania 
Following Millman's first-round victory at the 2013 Brisbane International, Brisbane Times journalist Phil Lutton coined the term 'Millmania' to describe his sudden success. The Sydney Morning Herald continued using the term at the Apia International.

Performance timelines

Singles 
Current through the 2022 Miami Open.

Doubles 
Current through the 2023 Australian Open.

ATP career finals

Singles: 3 (1 title, 2 runner-ups)

Challenger and Futures finals

Singles: 32 (19 titles, 13 runner-ups)

National representation

Davis Cup

Record against top 10 players
Millman's match record against players who have been ranked in the top 10, former #1 in bold. Only ATP Tour main-draw matches are considered.

  Tommy Robredo 3–1
  Lucas Pouille 2–0
  Hubert Hurkacz 2–0
  Fernando Verdasco 2–1
  Richard Gasquet 1–0
  Ernests Gulbis 1–0
  Jack Sock 1–0
  Fabio Fognini 1–1
  Karen Khachanov 1–1
  Felix Auger-Aliassime 1–1
  Gilles Simon 1–1
  Diego Schwartzman 1–2
  Roger Federer 1–3
  Dominic Thiem 1–3
  Pablo Carreño Busta 1–4
  Matteo Berrettini 0–1
  Jannik Sinner 0–1
  Juan Martín del Potro 0–1
  David Ferrer 0–1
  Casper Ruud 0–1
  David Goffin 0–1
  Gaël Monfils 0–1
  Milos Raonic 0–1
  Andrey Rublev 0–1
  Denis Shapovalov 0–1
  Radek Štěpánek 0–1
  Stefanos Tsitsipas 0–1
  Marcos Baghdatis 0–2
  Marin Čilić 0–2
  Grigor Dimitrov 0–2
  Andy Murray 0–2
  Rafael Nadal 0–2
  Kei Nishikori 0–2
  Alexander Zverev 0–3
  Novak Djokovic 0–3
  John Isner 0–4
  Roberto Bautista Agut 0–5

*

Wins over top 10 players
He has a 1–19 (5%) record against players who were, at the time the match was played, ranked in the top 10.

Records
 These records were attained in the Open Era of tennis.

See also
List of Australia Davis Cup team representatives
Australia Davis Cup team
Tennis at the 2016 Summer Olympics
Tennis at the 2020 Summer Olympics

References

External links 

 
 
 
 John Millman profile on Tennis Australia

1989 births
Living people
Australian male tennis players
Tennis players from Brisbane
People educated at Anglican Church Grammar School
Tennis players at the 2016 Summer Olympics
Olympic tennis players of Australia
Tennis players at the 2020 Summer Olympics
21st-century Australian people